The Boston University Terriers women's ice hockey program represented Boston University during the 2020–21 NCAA Division I women's ice hockey season. 

Hockey East announced plans in November for a modified season, due to the ongoing COVID-19 pandemic. Teams played 18 games in a round robin format to determine the regular season champion. The Terriers played home and home series on weekends, with day of game travel, to allow time for testing, except when playing the Vermont Catamounts or Maine Black Bears.

Regular season

Standings

Schedule
Source:

|- 
!colspan=12 style="  "| Regular Season
|-

|- 
!colspan=12 style="  "| Hockey East Tournament
|-

2020-21 Terriers

As of September 2020.

Awards and honors
Jesse Compher, Hockey East Second Team All-Star

References

 

Boston university Terriers
2020-21 Boston university Terriers women's ice hockey season
Boston University Terriers women's ice hockey season
Boston University Terriers women's ice hockey season
Boston University Terriers women's ice hockey season
Boston University Terriers women's ice hockey season